Ivan Popov is the name of:
 Ivan Popov (cyclist) (1951–2014), Bulgarian Olympic cyclist
 Ivan Popov (wrestler), Australian wrestler
Ivan Popov (general) who died during St Nedelya Church assault
, see Tripartite Pact
Ivan Popov (governor), see List of governors of Chernigov Governorate
Ivan Popov (chess player), Russian chess grandmaster
 Ivan Popov (revolutionary), Bulgarian revolutionary
 Ivan Evseyevich Popov, (1797–1879) a Russian Orthodox missionary priest
Ivan Nikolaevich Popov (1878-after 1912), Russian deputy in 3rd Imperial Duma
 Ivan Popov (spy) (1910–1980), Serbian spy who work for MI6 during World War II